Please Give is a 2010 dark comedy film written and directed by Nicole Holofcener and starring Catherine Keener. It is the fourth film Keener and Holofcener have made together. The film also stars Amanda Peet, Oliver Platt, Rebecca Hall, Lois Smith, Elizabeth Keener, Kevin Corrigan, and Ann Guilbert. This was also Guilbert's last film role before her death in 2016.

Plot summary

Kate and Alex are a couple living in a New York City apartment with their teenage daughter, Abby. Kate and Alex own a furniture store specializing in used modern furniture, which they buy at estate sales. They have bought the apartment adjacent to theirs, but its occupant, the elderly and cranky Andra, will stay in it until she dies. Andra has two granddaughters, the dutiful and generous Rebecca, a mammography technologist, and the cynical, sharp-tongued Mary, a cosmetologist.

Kate is troubled by the profits she makes from furniture sellers who do not know the value of what they are selling; the contrast between homeless people in her neighborhood and her own comfortable life; and the fact that her family will only be able to expand their apartment when Andra dies. She tries to assuage her guilt through volunteer jobs (which leave her weeping) and donations to homeless individuals (which sometimes backfire).

Cast
 Catherine Keener as Kate
 Oliver Platt as Alex
 Ann Morgan Guilbert as Andra
 Amanda Peet as Mary
 Rebecca Hall as Rebecca
 Elizabeth Keener as Cathy
 Sarah Steele as Abby

Release
Please Give was screened out of competition at the 60th Berlin International Film Festival, and had a limited U.S. release on April 30, 2010. It opened with $118,123 in five theaters, averaging $23,625 per cinema.

Filming
Please Give was filmed almost entirely in New York City. The bulk of the film was shot in Chelsea, including the spa scenes at Skintology, a day and medical spa.

Reception
Please Give received generally positive reviews. The film has a score of 78 out of 100 on the review aggregator website Metacritic, based on 35 critic reviews, indicating "generally favorable reviews". On Rotten Tomatoes, it has an 86% approval rating based on 143 reviews. The website's critics consensus reads: "Nicole Holofcener's newest might seem slight in places, but its rendering of complex characters in a conflicted economic landscape is varied, natural, and touching all the same."

References

External links
 
 
 Please Give at Rotten Tomatoes
 
 Please Give at The Movies Five

2010 films
2010 black comedy films
American black comedy films
American independent films
Films directed by Nicole Holofcener
Films scored by Marcelo Zarvos
Films set in New York City
Films shot in New York City
Films with screenplays by Nicole Holofcener
Sony Pictures Classics films
2010 independent films
2010s English-language films
2010s American films